Rymzo  (real name Churchill Sosa De Gusto) born April 23, 1974 in Lagos state is a Nigerian musical recording artist and producer. His music is influenced by many  artistes including Fela Anikulapo-Kuti, Jimi Hendrix, U-Roy, I-Roy, Bob Marley, Naughty by Nature, Kool Moe Dee, Shabba Ranks, Tiger, Cocoa Tea, Capleton, Joe Higgs.

Music career
Rymzo was first famous in live music cafes as a lead vocalist to one of the most popular rock/reggae bands in Nigeria's Niger-Delta region in the early 1990s known as "The Vintage Band" a band that metamorphosed from "The Difference Jazz Band".  They won the maiden edition of the Benson and Hedges regional "Grab the Mic"  contest in Benin City with Rymzo then known as "Coolrymes" as lead singer and band leader.

Rymzo produced his first album "Take Mediocre Off The Stage" in 2005 which had the hit single "Rock n Roll" that was a nationwide chartbuster in 2004 prior to the album release. "Rock n Roll" had earlier been released as a hit single in 2004, sealing Rymzo's position as the biggest new Reggae sensation in Nigeria at the time.  His second album "Mysterious" came out in 2006.

As a renowned producer, Rymzo has worked or performed in so many musical projects, radio commercials for individuals and companies, media station IDs and has also worked in collaboration or as a producer with several top Nigerian music artistes such as Tunde and Wunmi Obe, Segun Obe, Kefee, Goldie, Sunny Neji, Muma Gee, Sammy Okposo, Charly Boy, Sound Sultan, Lady D, Orits Wiliki, Ras Kimono, Felix Duke, Oritshe Femi and Da grin, Ruggedman, Nomoreloss, Mr Kool, 2face Idibia, Omotola Jalade Ekeinde, Freestyle, Da tribe, Francis Goldman, Modele.

Rymzo tours with his eight-man band, The 12 Tribes, and has graced the same stage with many great reggae artiste including Steel Pulse, Anthony B, Capleton, 2face Idibia, P Square, Morgan Heritage, Victor Essiet (The Mandators), Majek Fashek, General Levy, Alpha Blondy, Maxi Priest, and Shaggy.

Rhymzo was one of the most influential reggae musicians of his time. His album Take Mediocre Offstage was instrumental in sustaining the reggae genre in Nigeria in the absence of great acts of the 1980s and 1990s like Majek Fashek.

References

Living people
21st-century Nigerian male singers
1974 births
Nigerian record producers
Musicians from Lagos State
20th-century Nigerian male singers